Flemming Falkenberg Mortensen (born 7 July 1944) is a Danish former footballer who played as a defender. He made 16 appearances for the Denmark national team from 1968 to 1977.

References

External links
 
 

1944 births
Living people
People from Kalundborg
Danish men's footballers
Association football defenders
Denmark international footballers
Denmark youth international footballers
Denmark under-21 international footballers
Boldklubben Frem  players
FC Vestsjælland players
Hellerup IK players
Holbæk B&I players
Sportspeople from Region Zealand